Artch is a heavy metal band from Sarpsborg, Norway. Initially formed in 1983 by guitarist Cato André Olsen and bass player Bernt Jansen, in 1984 guitarist Geir Nilssen, drummer Jørn Jamissen and vocalist Lars Fladeby all joined the band but they had formerly been with a local rock group called Oxygen. Espen Hoff replaced Fladeby as lead singer in 1985, but he died in a motorcycle accident later that same year, and was replaced by Eiríkur Hauksson in 1986. Artch released two albums on the American record label Metal Blade that got great reviews, especially in the English heavy metal press, but sales were disappointing. Drummer Jamissen left the band in 1991 and was replaced by Gudmund Bolsgård. They reformed in 2000 after a prolonged period of inactivity.

Their original lineup was reunited again in 2010.

Discography
Demo (Demo, 1984)	
Time Waits For No One (Demo, 1987)	
Another Return (Metal Blade, 1988)
"Shoot to Kill" / "Reincarnation" (single, 1988)
For the Sake of Mankind (Metal Blade, 1991)	
Another Return - Live... And Beyond (DVD, 2004)

References

Norwegian power metal musical groups
Musical quintets
1983 establishments in Norway
Musical groups established in 1983
Musical groups from Sarpsborg
Metal Blade Records artists